Honduras has four main public libraries, the National Library Juan Ramón Molina, the Library of the Autonomous National University of Honduras and the Skilled Library of Art Queen Sofia.

One of the first libraries in Honduras was the personal library of the doctor in laws and first president of Honduras, Dionisio of Herrera, composed mainly by books written in French language, this library was ignited during his presidential period in 1826 by his oppositores accusing to keep books "herejes".

In 2001 Honduras agreed to invest 18 billion of Lempiras in social projects of education, health and culture between 2001 and 2015, during this time did not create  new schools neither new areas green and recreational neither new public libraries for the students.

National library Juan Ramón Molina 
National Library of Honduras is a public library founded on 27 August 1880 in the administration of Marco Aurelio Soto, by means of agreement of 11 February, with a budget assigned of one thousand weights.

Library of the Autonomous National University of Honduras 
The system librarian of the Autonomous National University of Honduras initiates like library of the university centre of regional studies in the year 1970 and later becomes the central library of the UNAH. It has more than 100 one thousand books and magazines.

Recently they assigned  20 million Lempiras to create a new building of library for the UNAH.

Library of Art Queen Sofia 
Library Queen Sofia finds  situated in the installations of the Museum of the Honduran Man, in the main city Tegucigalpa, M.D.C. In the republic of Honduras. The name of the library is in honour to His Majesty Mrs. Sofia of Greece, Reigns of Spain.

See also 
 Culture of Honduras
 Museums of Honduras
 Honduran institute of Anthropology and History
 Museum for the National Identity
 National archive of Honduras
 Art in Honduras
 Museum of Anthropology and History (Honduras)
 Museum of the Honduran Man
 National museums of Spain
 Strategy for the Reduction of the Poverty

References 

 
Honduran culture